The following events occurred in May 1961:

May 1, 1961 (Monday)
Betting shops became legal in the United Kingdom, permitting UK residents to place bets, through a bookie, on horse races without going to the track.
A wave of hijackings of U.S. airline flights to Cuba began as Miami electrician Antuilio Ortiz, who had purchased a ticket listing himself on the manifest as "Cofresi Elpirata" (after the 19th century Caribbean pirate Roberto Cofresí), entered the cockpit of National Airlines Flight 337 shortly after it took off from Marathon, Florida to Key West, then forced the pilot to fly to Havana. Cuba's leader Fidel Castro allowed the plane, its crew, and all but one of its passengers to return to the U.S. the next day. Ortiz stayed behind and would live comfortably in Cuba for two years before becoming homesick for the U.S. After being incarcerated several times in Cuban prisons, Ortiz would finally be allowed to leave in 1975, and would spend four years in an American prison for the 1961 crime. In the next 12 years after Ortiz hijacked the flight, there would be 185 successful skyjackings until massive security measures were enacted by the U.S. at the end of 1972; only two of 42 attempts were successful for the rest of the 1970s.
Anticipating the expanded scope of human spaceflight programs, Space Task Group (STG) proposed a crewed spacecraft development center. The nucleus for a center existed in STG, which was handling the Mercury program. A program of much larger magnitude would require a substantial expansion of staff and facilities and of organization and management controls.
Born: Clint Malarchuk, Canadian ice hockey player, in Grande Prairie, Alberta. Malarchuk nearly bled to death in an NHL game in 1989.

May 2, 1961 (Tuesday)
The schooner sank almost instantly, taking with it six people - Alice Sheldon, ship's cook George Ptacnik, and students Chris Coristine, John Goodlett, Rick Marsellus, and Robin Wetherill. Thirteen other people on the student ship survived. The tragedy would later form the basis for the  1996 film White Squall.

May 3, 1961 (Wednesday)

The U.S. federal minimum wage was raised to $1.25 per hour by a 230-196 vote in the House of Representatives. Earlier, the U.S. Senate had approved the measure, advocated by President Kennedy, by a 64-28 vote.
Former British diplomat George Blake was sentenced to 42 years imprisonment for spying, one year for the life of each of the 42 British agents who died after Blake had betrayed them. Blake had been the U.K.'s vice-consul in South Korea before being captured during the Korean War and spending three years in an internment camp, and was later caught passing secrets of the British Navy to the Soviet Union. He escaped London's Wormwood Scrubs Prison on October 22, 1965, and eventually settled in Moscow.
A group of prominent civil rights activists, including John Lewis, Stokely Carmichael, Diane Nash and James Lawson, held the "Last Supper" in Washington, D.C., so-called because the Freedom Riders at the dinner believed they would be killed in the South when they began the Freedom Ride the next day.
The 1961 Cannes Film Festival opened.
Born: Leyla Zana, Kurdish politician, in Silvan, Turkey

May 4, 1961 (Thursday)
Queen Elizabeth II appointed Sir Ashley Clarke a Knight Grand Cross of the Royal Victorian Order.
Anthony Neil Wedgwood Benn, 2nd Viscount Stansgate, won the 1961 Bristol South East by-election for the House of Commons constituency of Bristol South East. An Election Court would later award the seat to Benn's opponent, Malcolm St Clair.
In the United States, the Federal Aviation Administration initiated the creation of a comprehensive flight information service.

Commander Malcolm Ross and Lieutenant Commander Victor A. Prather set a new record for the highest balloon flight while testing full pressure flight suits. Lieutenant Commander Prather subsequently slipped from the sling and drowned after his suit flooded.
U.S. Representative Overton Brooks (D-Louisiana), chairman of the House Committee on Science and Astronautics, wrote a detailed memo to U.S. Vice President Lyndon B. Johnson, chairman of the National Aeronautics and Space Council, advocating the appropriation of additional federal funds to the U.S. space program in order "to gain unequivocal leadership in Space Exploration."
In the U.S., thirteen members of the "Freedom Riders" began a bus trip to test the limits on segregation on interstate bus rides, following the new U.S. Supreme Court integration ruling in Boynton v. Virginia.
Near Geary, Oklahoma, the new practice of storm chasing yielded the first motion and still pictures taken of a tornado simultaneous with film of its progress on radar, as part of the National Severe Storms Project.
Born:
General Peter Bartram, Chief of Defence for Denmark, 2012 to 2016; in Aarhus
Luis Herrera, Colombian road racing cyclist; in Fusagasugá
Richard Hill, English rugby union scrum-half with 29 appearances for the England national team between 1984 and 1991; in Birmingham
Donald Lawrence, American gospel music songwriter and Grammy Award winner; in Charlotte, North Carolina
Mary Elizabeth McDonough, American actress best known as "Erin" on The Waltons; in Los Angeles, California
Paul Steven Miller, American law professor and Commissioner of the Equal Employment Opportunity Commission, 1994 to 2004; in Flushing, Queens, New York City (d. 2010, cancer)
Anne Murray, cricketer for the Irish national women's team; in Dublin
Died:
Anita Stewart (born Anna Marie Stewart), 66, American silent film actress and producer, from a heart attack
Victor A. Prather, 34, United States Navy balloonist, by drowning

May 5, 1961 (Friday)

At 9:34 am, Alan Shepard became the first American in space as Freedom 7 lifted off from Cape Canaveral. Shepard's spacecraft, first of the Mercury program, reached an altitude of  without achieving orbit, and was recovered 19 minutes later by the aircraft carrier . The mission featured the first manual piloting of the spacecraft and also the landing with pilot still within it. The Redstone booster performed well during the boosted phase, although there were some vibrations, and cutoff was well within specified limits. After separation, Shepard exercised manual control of the spacecraft in the fly-by-wire and manual proportional modes. The attitude control system operated well, with few thruster fuel leaks. Reentry and landing were accomplished without any difficulty. The pilot experienced a maximum of 6 g's during the booster acceleration phase and slightly less than 12 g's upon reentry. The duration of the flight was 15 minutes and 22 seconds, with weightlessness existing for approximately 5 minutes. Recovery operations were perfect, as helicopters were able visually to follow the descent of the spacecraft. Contact was made with the pilot two minutes after impact and recovery was initiated. There was no damage to the spacecraft, and Shepard was in excellent condition. The first Mercury suborbital flight was a success. Because the spacecraft landed with pilot still within it and according to past definitions by the Fédération Aéronautique Internationale (FAI), Freedom 7 was the first "completed" crewed spaceflight mission.
NASA issued a proposal document to use Scout rockets to launch small satellites that would evaluate the worldwide Mercury Tracking Network in preparation for crewed orbital missions. NASA Headquarters would tentatively approve the plan on May 24, 1961.
A NASA Headquarters working group, headed by Bernard Maggin, completed a staff paper presenting arguments for establishing an integrated research, development, and applied orbital operations program at an approximate cost of $1 billion through 1970. In its report, the group identified three broad categories of orbital operations: inspection, ferry, and orbital launch. Maggin and his colleagues reasoned that future space programs would require the capability for such orbital operations and recommended that the development of an integrated program, coordinated with the U.S. Department of Defense, should begin immediately. Also, the group recommended that such a program, because of its scope and cost, be independent of other space programs and that NASA establish a separate project office to initiate and implement the program.

May 6, 1961 (Saturday)

Tottenham Hotspur F.C. defeated Leicester City 2-0 in the 1961 FA Cup Final before a crowd of 100,000 at Wembley, becoming the first team in the 20th century to win the English league and cup double. Aston Villa had won the double back in 1897.
Carry Back, ridden by Johnny Sellers, won the Kentucky Derby.  The racehorse, bred from a mare who had cost only $300, would earn more than a million dollars for his owners.  Carry Back won the Preakness Stakes, but failed to win the third part of U.S. horse racing's Triple Crown, finishing 7th in the Belmont Stakes. 
Born: 
George Clooney, American actor, director, screenwriter, producer, and activist, in Lexington, Kentucky
Patty Ryan, German pop music singer, in Wuppertal, West Germany
Died: Lucian Blaga, 65, Romanian poet, dramatist and philosopher

May 7, 1961 (Sunday)

China's Prime Minister Zhou Enlai telephoned Communist Party Chairman Mao Zedong after a tour in Handan County, Hebei Province, of rural villages affected by malnutrition and famine during the "Great Leap Forward" campaign of 1958 and brought an end to the practice of feeding people through inefficiently-operated collective dining halls.  Beginning in June, people were allowed to produce their own food rather than having all resources limited to the village "mess halls".
The Soviet Union restored capital punishment for embezzlement of public property.  Legal execution had been abolished for all purposes on May 26, 1947, but was gradually introduced for various crimes starting in 1950.  Females were exempt from the death penalty under any circumstances, as were men who had reached the age of 60 by the time of their sentencing.
UA Sedan-Torcy defeated Nîmes Olympique 3–1 in the Coupe de France Final before 45,000 at Colombes, France.
Died: Mukerjee (Yebaw Phyu Win), Burmese Communist leader, in a police raid.

May 8, 1961 (Monday)

Astronaut Alan Shepard, pilot of the Freedom 7 spacecraft (MR-3), was awarded the NASA Distinguished Service Medal by President John F. Kennedy in a ceremony at the White House.
Martin Company personnel briefed NASA officials in Washington, D.C., on the Titan II weapon system. Albert C. Hall of Martin had contacted NASA's Associate Administrator, Robert C. Seamans, Jr., on April 7 to propose the Titan II as a launch vehicle for a lunar landing program. Although skeptical, Seamans nevertheless arranged for a more formal presentation. Abe Silverstein, NASA Director, Office of Space Flight Programs, was sufficiently impressed by the Martin briefing to ask Director Robert R. Gilruth and Space Task Group to study possible Titan II uses. Silverstein shortly informed Seamans of the possibility of using the Titan II to launch a scaled-up Mercury spacecraft.
At the Savoy Hilton Hotel in New York City, the name of New York's new expansion team in the National League was made official. Joan Payson, the majority owner of the team, christened it as the New York Mets "by breaking a champagne bottle with a baseball bat." The name, short for Metropolitans, was chosen by the public, although Mrs. Payson's personal preference was the "Meadowlarks", and out of 9,613 suggestions, 644 names were selected and then reduced to ten, the other nine choices being Avengers, Bees, Burros, Continentals, Jets, NYBs, Rebels, Skyliners and Skyscrapers.
The comic strip Apartment 3-G, about three career women sharing an apartment in Manhattan, made its first appearance.
Born: David Winning, Canadian-American film director, in Calgary

May 9, 1961 (Tuesday)

Describing American television as "a vast wasteland", Federal Communications Commission Chairman Newton N. Minow addressed the National Association of Broadcasters in Washington, and implied that the FCC might not renew licenses of those entities that failed to upgrade their product. "I invite each of you to sit down in front of your television set when your station goes on the air and stay there, for a day, without a book, without a magazine, without a newspaper, without a profit and loss sheet or a rating book to distract you. Keep your eyes glued to that set until the station signs off. I can assure you that what you will observe is a vast wasteland," said Minow. "You will see a procession of game shows, formula comedies about totally unbelievable families, blood and thunder, mayhem, violence, sadism, murder, western bad men, western good men, private eyes, gangsters, more violence, and cartoons. And endlessly, commercials -- many screaming, cajoling, and offending. And most of all, boredom. True, you'll see a few things you will enjoy. But they will be very, very few. And if you think I exaggerate, I only ask you to try it."
Ground control destroyed the errant vehicle.
The B-52H entered service in the United States Air Force.

May 10, 1961 (Wednesday)

Air France Flight 406 crashed in the Sahara Desert while en route from Bangui to Marseilles.  All 79 people on board (69 passengers and the crew of 10) were killed when the Super Constellation crashed.
Charles R. Swart, who would be the last Governor-General of South Africa, was elected as that nation's first State President.  The vote in Parliament was 139-71 in favour of Swart over former Chief Justice Henry A. Fagan. Swart took office as State President on the 31st of May, the date the Union of South Africa became a republic and left the Commonwealth of Nations.
Born:
Danny Carey, American drummer (Tool), in Paola, Kansas
Johanna ter Steege, Dutch actress, in Wierden

May 11, 1961 (Thursday)
Angelino Soler won the 1961 Vuelta a España cycle race.
Mercury spacecraft 8A was delivered to Cape Canaveral for the Mercury-Atlas 4 (MA-4) orbital uncrewed (mechanical astronaut) mission.
Located near Bridgeport, Alabama, the cave was used as shelter by human beings for more than 8,000 years, dating back as far as 6500 BC.
Born: Cecile Licad, Filipina classical pianist, in Manila

May 12, 1961 (Friday)
Soviet leader Nikita Khrushchev "quite unexpectedly" accepted a suggestion from U.S. President John F. Kennedy that the two leaders meet at a conference in Vienna to discuss the future of Berlin. Three weeks later, Kennedy and Khrushchev would shake hands in Austria on June 3.
A brush fire in Hollywood, California, destroyed 24 houses, including the home of author Aldous Huxley, who lost almost all of his unpublished manuscripts and works in progress.
Born: Zeny & Zory (Zenaida Beveraggi and Zoralda Beveraggi), Las gemelas Beveraggi, Puerto Rican twin sister singing duo, in Santurce.
Died: Tony Bettenhausen, 44, American racecar driver and USAC driving champion for 1958, was killed at the Indianapolis Motor Speedway while testing the car to be driven by his friend Paul Russo in advance of the 1961 Indianapolis 500. "Failure of a 10-cent bolt led to the death of the full time farmer and part time race driver," a UPI report would note the next day. As Bettenhausen entered a turn, the bolt fell off the car's front rod support and "permitted the front axle to twist, thereby misaligning the front wheels", according to the U.S. Auto Club's report.

May 13, 1961 (Saturday)
NASA submitted its legislative program for the 87th Congress (S. 1857 and H.R. 7115), asking for authority to lease property, authority to acquire patent releases, replacement of semiannual reports to Congress with an annual one, and authority to indemnify contractors against unusually hazardous risks.
Gordon Reid founded the Canadian discount store Giant Tiger. The first store opened at 98 George Street in Ottawa.
Died: Gary Cooper, 60, American film star, died of colon cancer at his home in Bel Air in California. Cooper had won the Academy Award for Best Actor twice, for Sergeant York in 1942, and for High Noon in 1952.

May 14, 1961 (Sunday)

A Freedom Riders bus was fire-bombed near Anniston, Alabama and the civil rights protesters were beaten by an angry mob.  Sixteen members of the Congress of Racial Equality (CORE) had divided their group at Atlanta, with nine riding on a Greyhound bus and seven others on a Trailways bus.  Six miles beyond Anniston, a tire on the Greyhound bus was flattened.  Unbeknownst to either the riders or the mob, Alabama special agent Eli M. Cowling had boarded that bus in Atlanta, and prevented the crowd from exacting further violence on the Riders, but the bus itself was burned by the firebomb.  The Trailways bus riders arrived in Birmingham, where two of them were beaten up at the station.
The Monaco Grand Prix was won by Stirling Moss, beginning the 12th FIA Formula One World Championship season.

May 15, 1961 (Monday)

The Nirenberg and Matthaei experiment was performed by Heinrich Matthaei.  The Poly-U-Experiment enabled recognition and understanding of the genetic code. This is considered the birthdate of modern genetics.
Marcel Mihalovici's opera Krapp's Last Tape premièred in a French-language version on RTF radio.

May 16, 1961 (Tuesday)

A military coup in South Korea overthrew the government of Prime Minister Chang Myon (John M. Chang) and President Yung Po Sun.  At 3:30 in the morning local time, Republic of Korea forces led by Lt. Gen. Chang Do Yung seized control of police barracks and government offices in Seoul and other cities, then announced the takeover at 6:00 a.m.  General Park Chung Hee, Deputy Commander of the ROK Second Army, soon took over as the new President.  General Carter B. Magruder, Commander of the U.S. 8th Army and highest ranking American officer in Korea, declared American support for the Chang regime, but U.S. forces did not intervene during the tumult.
On the first day of an official visit to Canada, U.S. President John F. Kennedy re-injured his back while participating in a tree planting ceremony at Ottawa.   Kennedy, who had nearly died during back surgery in 1954, had been using a shovel to lift dirt, and was on crutches after returning home.

May 17, 1961 (Wednesday)
Calls for help from an unnamed, unrecognized Soviet spacecraft were (supposedly) received at the Torre Bert listening station by the Judica-Cordiglia brothers.
An Atlas investigation board was convened to study the cause of the Mercury-Atlas 3 (MA-3) mission launch vehicle failure. Several possible areas were considered, and three were isolated as probable causes based on a review of test data.
Space Task Group (STG) issued a Statement of Work for a Design Study of a Manned Spacecraft Paraglide Landing System. The purpose of the study was to define and evaluate problem areas and to establish the design parameters of a system to provide spacecraft maneuverability and controlled energy descent and landing by aerodynamic lift. McDonnell was already at work on a modified Mercury spacecraft; the proposed paraglide study was to be carried on concurrently to allow the paraglide landing system to be incorporated as an integral subsystem. STG Director Robert R. Gilruth requested that contracts for the design study be negotiated with three companies which already had experience with the paraglide concept: Goodyear Aircraft Corporation, Akron, Ohio; North American Aviation, Inc., Space and Information Systems Division, Downey, California; and Ryan Aeronautical Company, San Diego, California. Each contract would be funded to a maximum of $100,000 for a study to be completed within two and one-half months from the date the contract was awarded. Gilruth expected one of these companies subsequently to be selected to develop and manufacture a paraglide system based on the approved design concept. In less than three weeks, contracts had been awarded to all three companies. Before the end of June, the design study formally became Phase I of the Paraglider Development Program.
On the day that visiting U.S. President Kennedy was delivering a speech to a joint session of Canada's Parliament, Canadian Prime Minister John Diefenbaker found "a crumpled piece of paper in the wastebasket" of the room where the two leaders had met, and found it was a secret memorandum that had been left behind by the President, entitled "What We Want From the Ottawa Trip". According to one biographer of Diefenbaker, the first three points of what the U.S. wanted, on the memo, were "To push the Canadians towards an increased commitment to the Alliance for Progress", "To push them towards a decision to join the OAS" (Organization of American States), and "To push them towards a larger contribution for the India consortium". Another author would say later that Kennedy's handwritten notes in the margins of the memo included the letters "OAS", and that Diefenbaker believed that Kennedy had written "SOB" in reference to the Prime Minister. According to both accounts, Diefenbaker would angrily confront the U.S. Ambassador in May 1962 and threaten to reveal the contents of the discarded secret memo.
The first fatality in the history of Little League Baseball occurred during an evening game in Temple City, California. Nine-year-old Barry Babcock was struck in the chest by a pitched ball, with impact above his heart, and collapsed and died from a cardiac dysrhythmia. One week later, the second fatality in Little League baseball would take place when ten-year-old George McCormick, of Park Ridge, Illinois, was struck in the head by a batted ball during practice.
Born: Enya, Irish singer and composer, (as Eithne Patricia Ní Bhraonáin) in Gweedore, County Donegal

May 18, 1961 (Thursday)
Belgian musician Bobbejaan Schoepen married opera singer and photo model Josephina (Josée) Jongen.
Between May 18 and 31, Space Task Group Director Robert R. Gilruth informed Ames Research Center that current planning for Apollo "A" called for an adapter between the Saturn second stage and the Apollo spacecraft to include, as an integral part, a section to be used as an orbiting laboratory. The laboratory would provide the environment and facilities to conduct scientific experiments related to human operation of spacecraft. Gilruth requested that Ames forward to STG descriptions of scientific experiments believed to be important to the development of crewed space flights, together with a list of necessary support equipment requirements. In response to the request from the STG, ARC Director Smith J. DeFrance suggested a series of experiments that might be conducted from an Earth-orbiting laboratory: astronomical observations; monitoring the Sun's activity; testing a human's ability to work outside the vehicle; zero-g testing; and micrometeoroid impact study. DeFrance noted that all of these experiments could be performed in the lunar mission module part of the Apollo space vehicle with little or no design modification.

May 19, 1961 (Friday)

The Soviet space probe Venera 1 became the first man-made object to make a "fly-by" of another planet by passing Venus. However, the Soviet launched probe had lost contact with Earth a month earlier, and did not send back any data.
NASA Headquarters and the Space Task Group began a concerted effort in reviewing Mercury progress to identify technical developments that were potential inventions, discoveries, improvements, and innovations. This action was in keeping with the policy and concept of providing information on technical advances, within security limits and when appropriate, to other agencies of the government and to American industry.

May 20, 1961 (Saturday)

The 1961 Giro d'Italia cycling event began.
Died: Nannie Helen Burroughs, 82, African-American educator and religious leader

May 21, 1961 (Sunday)

Alabama Governor John Patterson declared martial law in the city of Montgomery after race riots broke out. Major General Henry V. Graham was given virtually unlimited power to attempt to restore order.
Died: B. J. Palmer, 79, American pioneer of chiropractic medicine

May 22, 1961 (Monday)

The next phase of the Nirenberg and Matthaei experiment began at 3:30 pm as Heinrich Matthaei began the process of adding a synthesized RNA molecule sample, "consisting of the simple repetition of one type of nucleotide", to a centrifuged sample of 20 amino acid proteins.  The results were realized less than five days later on Saturday, May 27.  At 6:00 in the morning, with the isolation of the amino acid of phenylalanine.  "In less than a week," it would later be observed, "Matthaei had identified the first 'word' of the genetic code".
The London Trophy was won at Crystal Palace by Roy Salvadori in a Cooper T53.

May 23, 1961 (Tuesday)
The patent for the modern dropped ceiling, now universal in room construction, was issued to Donald A. Brown, who had applied for it on September 8, 1958. U.S. Patent No. 2,984,946 for "Accessible suspended ceiling construction" was granted to Brown who improved on the 1919 patent of Eric E. Hall's interlocking dropped ceiling tiles, with Donn Products' system of "slabs, panels, sheets or the like positioned on the upperside of, or held against the underside of the horizontal flanges of the supporting construction."
The four-year scientific investigation into Fletcher's Ice Island began.
On May 23 and 24, the fourth development engineering inspection on Mercury spacecraft was held at McDonnell. Inspection activities were primarily centered on spacecraft No. 18, and some 45 requests for alterations were initiated.

May 24, 1961 (Wednesday)
Freedom Riders were arrested in Jackson, Mississippi, for "disturbing the peace" after disembarking from their bus.
The Milwaukee Road's Olympian Hiawatha passenger train made its final run between Chicago, Illinois, and Seattle, Washington.

May 25, 1961 (Thursday)

Addressing a joint session of the United States Congress, American President John F. Kennedy called for a vastly accelerated space program, declaring, "I believe this nation should commit itself to achieving the goal, before this decade is out, of landing a man on the Moon and returning him safely to the earth." For this and associated projects in space technology, the President requested additional appropriations totaling $611 million for NASA and the Department of Defense. Congress would respond with increased funding for the Apollo program. Apollo 11 would land on the Moon, with 164 days left in the 1960s, on July 20, 1969.
King Hussein of Jordan, 25, married an English commoner, 20-year-old Toni Gardiner (later renamed Muna al-Hussein), making her his second wife. Gardiner was not present at the "all male" Muslim ceremony, which took place at the Zahran Palace near Amman and saw the king sign a wedding pledge. Initially, she was "neither a queen nor a princess" but took on the title and name "Sahibat al Sown Wa al Isma Muna al-Hussein".

May 26, 1961 (Friday)
Between this date and June 4, 1961, the Mercury spacecraft Freedom 7 (MR-3) was displayed at the Paris International Air Show. Some 650,000 visitors received the details on the spacecraft and on Shepard's suborbital flight.
From May 26 to 27, the first conference on the "Peaceful Uses of Space" was held at Tulsa, Oklahoma. A second conference on this subject would be held at Seattle, Washington, on May 8-10, 1962. In both instances, Robert R. Gilruth reported on the human spaceflight aspect.
The first flight of the Canadair CF-104 Starfighter was made.
Born: Tarsem Singh, Indian film director

May 27, 1961 (Saturday)

Tunku Abdul Rahman, Prime Minister of Malaya, held a press conference in Singapore to announce his proposal to form the Federation of Malaysia, comprising Malaya, Singapore, Sarawak, Brunei and North Borneo (Sabah).
American athlete Ralph Boston broke the long jump world record at Modesto, California, with a distance of 8.24 metres (27 feet, 4 inches).
Born: Northern Dancer, Canadian thoroughbred racehorse and winner of the 1964 Kentucky Derby and the Preakness Stakes; in Oshawa, Ontario (d. 1990)
Died: Maria Fris, 29, prima ballerina of the Hamburg State Opera, jumped to her death from a catwalk at the opera house during rehearsals for a production of Sergei Prokofiev's ballet of Romeo and Juliet. Fris had been despondent from a chronic tendon inflammation that had ruined her career.

May 28, 1961 (Sunday)

Peter Benenson's article "The Forgotten Prisoners" was published in several internationally read newspapers, and inspired the founding of the human rights organization Amnesty International.
The Orient Express made its final run, traveling between Paris, France, and Bucharest, Romania.

May 29, 1961 (Monday)

A West Virginia couple, Mr. and Mrs. Alderson Muncy of Paynesville, West Virginia, became the first American food stamp recipients under a pilot program of the U.S. Department of Agriculture, being tested in eight communities. For the month of June, the Muncys received $95 worth of food coupons for their household of fifteen people, and made the first purchase at Henderson's Supermarket.
President John F. Kennedy formally petitioned the Interstate Commerce Commission to adopt "stringent regulations" prohibiting segregation in interstate bus travel. The proposed order, issued on September 22 and effective on November 1, removed Jim Crow signs in stations and ended segregation of waiting rooms, water fountains, and restrooms in interstate bus terminals later that same year, giving the Freedom Riders an unequivocal victory in their campaign.
Between this date and June 30, a centrifuge training program was conducted at the Aviation Medical Acceleration Laboratory directed entirely toward training the astronauts for the Mercury-Atlas orbital missions.
Rafael Leónidas Trujillo, totalitarian despot of the Dominican Republic since 1930, was killed in an ambush, putting an end to the second longest-running dictatorship in Latin American history. Trujillo was being driven in his car from his residence in San Cristobal to Ciudad Trujillo. Shortly after 10:00 pm local time, a sedan pulled into the path of his car, and assassins with machine guns killed both Trujillo and the chauffeur. The news was not announced to the Dominican public until 5:00 pm the next day.

May 30, 1961 (Tuesday)

KLM Flight 897 crashed at 1:19 in the morning, shortly after taking off from Lisbon, ultimately bound for Caracas. High winds and driving rains brought the DC-8 jet down into the ocean off of the coast of Portugal, with wreckage and bodies washing onto the beach. All 61 people on board died.
American driver A. J. Foyt won the 1961 Indianapolis 500, the first not to be included in the Formula One championship.

May 31, 1961 (Wednesday)
Trial opened in the Rokotov-Faibishenko case in Moscow City Court for foreign currency smugglers I. T. Rokotov, Vladislav Faibishenko, and seven other people. Rokotov and Faibishenko, originally sentenced to 15 years in prison, would be retried after a new law went into effect on July 1, providing for the death penalty. Both 22, they would be executed after their conviction on July 21.
In Switzerland, S.L. Benfica of Portugal won the European Cup, beating Spain's FC Barcelona (3-2) at Bern to become the champion club of European soccer football.

Following the 1960 referendum, the Union of South Africa became the Republic of South Africa and left the British Commonwealth of Nations, with former Governor-General Charles Robberts Swart as the first State President of South Africa.
In France, rebel generals Maurice Challe and André Zeller, captured soon after the Algiers putsch, were sentenced to 15 years in prison.
Presidents John F. Kennedy of the United States and Charles De Gaulle of France met in Paris. Making her first trip to Europe as First Lady, Jackie Kennedy charmed the crowds as she arrived for dinner at the Elysee Palace. Her new hairstyle, created by the Paris coiffeur Alexandre, made fashion news worldwide. 
Died: Roger Gavoury, 50, French National Police Commissioner of Algiers, assassinated by the OAS

References

1961
1961-05
1961-05